Bruce Duane Robbins (born September 10, 1959) is a former Major League Baseball pitcher for the Detroit Tigers from 1979 to 1980. Robbins, a left-handed batter, also threw left-handed.

Early life 
Robbins attended Blackford High School in Hartford City, Indiana. The Tigers drafted him out of high school in the 14th round of the 1977 amateur draft.

References 

Venezuelan Professional Baseball League

1959 births
Baseball players from Indiana
Birmingham Barons players
Bristol Tigers players
Detroit Tigers players
Evansville Triplets players
Lakeland Tigers players
Leones del Caracas players
American expatriate baseball players in Venezuela
Living people
Major League Baseball pitchers
Montgomery Rebels players
People from Portland, Indiana